, also known as GTV, is a television network headquartered in Gunma Prefecture, Japan. It is a member of the Japanese Association of Independent Television Stations (JAITS). Gunma TV is the first independent television station in Kantō region, it was started broadcast in 1971.  The government of Gunma Prefecture is the biggest shareholder of GTV, and they broadcast its promotion program on GTV. 

On September 1, 2006, GTV started digital terrestrial television broadcasting.

References

External links
 Official website 

Television stations in Japan
Independent television stations in Japan
1970 establishments in Japan
Television channels and stations established in 1970